Jaba is a Local Government Area in southern Kaduna State, Nigeria. It covers an area of 531 km2. It is located close to the Jos Plateau region and Abuja in the central part of Nigeria in West Africa. The local government capital is in the town of Kwoi. The postal code of the area is 801. The Chairman of the local government oversee both economic and developmental activities in the area.

Etymology
It is named after  a local Hausa word used to describe the Ham people who occupy most of the local government. The Ham people describe the word  as derogatory.

History 
The Local Government was created on the 27th of August 1991.  It was carved out from Jema'a Local Government Area. The local government is one of the old place in southern Kaduna, which the Java paramount chiefs since the colonial administration from 1910 till date.

Boundaries
Jaba Local Government Area shares boundaries with Kachia Local Government Area to the northwest, Kagarko Local Government Area to the southwest, Zangon Kataf Local Government Area to the north, Jema'a Local Government Area to the east and Nasarawa State to south, respectively.

Administrative subdivisions
Jaba Local Government Area consists of 10 subdivisions (second-order administrative divisions) or electoral wards, namely:
 Chori (Kyoli) - consisting of Kyoli speakers
 Daddu
 Dura Bitaro
 Fada
 Fai
 Nduya
 Nok
 Sabchem
 Sabzuro
 Samban

Demographics 
At the 2000 and 2006 census, there were 155,973 people in the local government area and a 2016 projection of 210,500. It is inhabited predominantly by Ham people, part of the people likely to have created the Nok culture.

The inhabitants are predominantly Christians.

Infrastructure

Roads 
From the Plateau State capital, Jos, it is a journey by road to Kafanchan to Sambang, Kwain, Nok, and to all other villages. From Kaduna, it is a journey through Kachia, Ngboodub, Ghikyaar and to Har Kwain.

Education 
There are a few administrative offices/agencies with educational institutions with the only higher institution being ECWA Pastors' Training College in Kwain (Kwoi).

Notable people
 Ishaya Ibrahim, military personnel
 Adamu Maikori, lawyer, banker, politician
 Audu Maikori, lawyer, entrepreneur
 Yahaya Maikori, lawyer, entrepreneur
 Usman Mu'azu, military personnel
 Andrew Jonathan Nok, biochemist

References

External links

Local Government Areas in Kaduna State